Royal Air Force Down Ampney or more simply RAF Down Ampney is a former Royal Air Force station located  north east of Cricklade, Wiltshire and  south west of RAF Fairford, Gloucestershire. The airfield operated during the Second World War from February 1944 until February 1947.

Down Ampney was part of a group of airfields dedicated to air transportation, alongside RAF Broadwell and RAF Blakehill Farm.

Based units

No. 48 Squadron RAF and No. 271 Squadron RAF flew Douglas Dakotas on major missions. On D-Day they dropped the main elements of the 3rd Parachute Brigade in Normandy as well as towing Airspeed Horsa gliders across the English Channel. They were also active in Operation Market Garden (Arnhem) and the Rhine crossing.
The same squadrons also flew Casevac flights to bring home wounded personnel from B landing grounds and airfields after the D Day landings.  These flights took about 80 minutes and included RAF nurses.

Memorial
A memorial has been erected at the southern end of what was the main runway. which reads:

References

External links
The R.A.F Down Ampney Association
R.A.F Down Ampney Memorial

 

Royal Air Force stations in Gloucestershire
Royal Air Force stations of World War II in the United Kingdom
Defunct airports in England
1944 establishments in England
1947 disestablishments in England